Hans Kristian Bromstad (28 March 1903 in Skjørn – 19 July 1971) was a Norwegian politician for the Liberal Party.

He served as a deputy representative to the Norwegian Parliament from Sør-Trøndelag during the term 1958–1961 and 1961–1965.

On the local level Bromstad was mayor of Stjørna municipality from 1937 to 1955, except for the years 1940 to 1945 during the German occupation of Norway. Other than that he worked as a farmer.

References

1903 births
1971 deaths
Deputy members of the Storting
Liberal Party (Norway) politicians
Mayors of places in Sør-Trøndelag
Norwegian farmers
Place of death missing